João Lucas & Marcelo (also is João Lucas e Marcelo) is a sertanejo style Brazilian singing duo formed in 2010. João Lucas (born in 1980 in Miranorte, Tocantins) is a vocalist and multi-instrumentalist. Marcelo (born 1986 in Cáceres, Mato Grosso) is main vocalist, and a songwriter who has written songs for Vitor e Léo, Luan Santana, Fernando e Sorocaba and others. They are most famous for their hit "Eu Quero Tchu, Eu Quero Tcha". The song's choreography was re-enacted by Brazilian football (soccer) player Neymar celebrating his hundredth career goal. The song reached Top 10 of Brasil Hot 100 Airplay.

Discography

Albums

EPs
2012: Eu Quero Tchu, Eu Quero Tcha (Letra e música para ouvir)
2012: Louca Louquinha (EP)

Singles
2012: "Eu Quero Tchu, Eu Quero Tcha"

References

External links
Official website
Facebook
Twitter
YouTube

Sertanejo music groups
Sertanejo musicians
Brazilian musical duos
2010 establishments in Brazil
Musical groups established in 2010